North Blenheim Historic District is a national historic district located at the hamlet of North Blenheim in Schoharie County, New York.  The district includes 25 contributing buildings and one contributing site.  Most of the buildings exhibit some influence from the vernacular Greek Revival style.  Located within the district is an exceptional Greek Revival church built in 1841.

It was added to the National Register of Historic Places in 1974.

References

Historic districts on the National Register of Historic Places in New York (state)
Historic districts in Schoharie County, New York
National Register of Historic Places in Schoharie County, New York